Bangla Desh – A Voice of a New Nation was an anthology of poems published in 1971, when the people of the-then East Pakistan, now Bangladesh, was fighting the war of independence against the occupation army of West Pakistan. It was a collection of seventy poems by fifty poets, all translated from Bengali into English by Pritish Nandy. It was stated in the credit page that 'The translator's royalty from the sale of this book will be donated to the Bangla Desh Assistance Fund'. Notably Bangladesh emerged as an independent state on 16 December 1971.

The book was published by Dialogue Publications, Calcutta.  The cover of the anthology was designed by Dhunji and Anil Sahafor. A photograph taken by Shambhu Saha was used. The price of the book was fixed Taka Fifty or US dollar 3. The printer's line noted as follows : "Published by Sajeda Asad for  Publications from 5 Pearl Road, Calcutta 17, India and printed by her at Mudranika, 29/3 Nirmal Chunder Street, Calcutta, Cover printed at Cameo (Pvt) Ltd." It may be noted that 'Bangladesh' (one word) was written as 'Bangla Desh' (two words).

List of poets and poems

 Abdul Ghani Hazari : 21 February, The Heart Of The Sahib 
 Abdul Mannan Sayyad : The Road
 Abu Bakr Siddique : The Song Of The People
 Abu Hena Mustafa Kamal : My Truth, This Land
 Abul Hassan : My Problems
 Abu Jafar Obaidulla : The Girl
 Abul Ahsan Choudhury Bangladesh : My Bangladesh, For Tomorrow, 
 Abu Hussain : The Civic Address
 Ahmad Mansur : A Daily Scene
 Ahsan Habib ???
 Akhter-Ul-Alam The Diary That I Have Misplaced, 
 Al Mahmud : In The Dark One Day, Consolation
 Al Mujahidi : The Song Of The People
 Alauddin Al Azaad Continuity, What Remained
 Anisuzzaman : They 
 Asad Choudhury : I Am A Coward
 Begum Sufia Kamal : Our Language : The Language Of Bengal  ; 8th Falgun
 Burhanuddin Khan Jahagir : The Clear Route
 Daud Haidar One Day No One Shall Recognise The Other
 Dilwar A Fistful Of Sunshine
 Fazal Shahabuddin : A Poem For A Girl 
 Hasan Hafizur Ranman : The Immortal 21 February, A Face In The Procession 
 Hayat Mahmud : A Daily Scene
 Humayun Azaad : The Blood Bank
 Jasimuddin : Song Of The Twentyfirst
 Kaisul Huq Krishnachura, On A Branch Of Intense Desire, 
 Latifa Hilali : Where The Skies Are
 Manzure Maula : The Night Of Prayer
 Maqid Haidar : I Shall Go
 Mashukur Rahman Choudhury : A Poem
 Mohammad Moniruzzaman : Transient Beauty, The Love Letter, 
 Muhammad Sahed Ali : The Bleeding Rose
 Motiyul Islam : Daughter Of The Soil 
 Motiyur Rahman : Announcing Myself
 Murshed Shafiul Hasan : In My Mother's Eyes
 Nazim Mahmud : Not Peace - Struggle
 Nirmalendu Goon : My Role
 Niyamat Hussain : Rabindranath Tagore, 
 Omar Ali : One Day A Man, The Lonely Man, The Boulder and My Love, 
 Rafiq Azaad : The Poet
 Saleh Ahmad : I Know The Mountain And The Sea, 
 Sanaul Huq : This Is The Peace We Have Shared, Victory Is Mine, If You Had The Wings Of A Butterfly
 Shahadat Hussain Bulbul : Why Does The Sun Weep?
 Shaheed Quadri : Beloved, At Each Other, and Illusion
 Shaheedulla Qaisar : To The Mother Of A Martyr 
 Shamsur Rahman : A Silver Shower, Prejudice, To The Lord, The Flame, Pain and Death Anniversary
 Sikandar Abu Jafar : I Watch The People, This Struggle Shall Go On 
 Syed Ali Ahsan : A Poem, and Suddenly Surprised
 Syed Shamsul Huq : Mother, and Two People
 Zia Haidar : Rabindranath Tagore.

Bangladesh Liberation War
Bengali poetry
Bengali poetry in English translation